József Sebők (born 18 June 1975 in Keszthely) is a retired Hungarian international football striker.

Career
He started his career at his home town club Keszthely SE from where he moved in 1995 to Zalaegerszegi TE. He will play with ZTE 5 consecutive seasons in Hungarian top league before moving in 2000 to Cyprus.

He was one of the best players that AEL Limassol ever had; he scored the goal of the year in the year 2003–2004 and was loved extremely by the AEL Limassol fans. He assisted many goals and scored even more; this made him very famous in Cyprus. Some even hail him as one of the best players to ever compete in the island. After leaving AEL Limassol he returned. 300 people went to the airport to greet him, but he was not able to play as well as before due to an injury.

In 2007, he signed with Slovenian First League club NK Nafta Lendava where he will play until 2010. He finished his career back in Hungary with Hévíz FC.

He was mostly deployed as a winger in both sides, mostly in left, but was also very competent as a striker.

National team
Between 1998 and 2004 József Sebők played a total of 12 matches for the Hungarian national team having scored twice.  Earlier he had been a member of the Hungarian U-21 team.

References

External links 
Player profile – PrvaLiga

Profile at futball-adattar.hu

1975 births
Living people
Sportspeople from Keszthely
Hungarian footballers
Hungary international footballers
Hungarian expatriate footballers
Association football forwards
Keszthely FC footballers
Zalaegerszegi TE players
AEL Limassol players
Expatriate footballers in Cyprus
NK Nafta Lendava players
Expatriate footballers in Slovenia
Hévíz FC footballers
Cypriot First Division players
Slovenian PrvaLiga players